Golyshevite is a rare mineral of the eudialyte group, with formula Na10Ca3Ca6Zr3Fe2SiNb(Si3O9)2(Si9O27)2CO3(OH)3•H2O. The original formula was extended to show both the presence of cyclic silicate groups and silicon at the M4 site, according to the nomenclature of the eudialyte group. The characteristic feature of golyshevite is calcium-rich composition, with calcium at two main sites instead of one site. Together with feklichevite, fengchengite, ikranite and mogovidite it is a ferric-iron-dominant representative of the group. It is chemically similar to mogovidite. Golyshevite was named after Russian crystallographer Vladimir Mikhailovich Golyshev.

Occurrence and association
Golyshevite and mogovidite were found in calcium-bearing peralkaline pegmatites of the Kovdor massif, Kola Peninsula, Russia. Minerals associated with golyshevite are aegirine-augite, calcite, cancrinite, hedenbergite, orthoclase, pectolite, tacharanite, and thomsonite-Ca.

Notes on chemistry
Impurities in golyshevite include chlorine, potassium, manganese, aluminium, cerium and lanthanum.

Notes on crystal structure
Calcium in golyshevite is present at M(1) and N(4) sites.

References

Cyclosilicates
Sodium minerals
Calcium minerals
Iron(II,III) minerals
Zirconium minerals
Niobium minerals
Trigonal minerals
Minerals in space group 160